Paws is an EP released by Four Tet on 7 December 2001. It consists of remixes of works on his album Pause; the EP's name is a pun on the album's title.

Track listing
 "Glue of the Other World" – 7:34
 "Hilarious Movie of the 90's" (Koushik's Funny Flick) – 2:39
 "Hilarious Movie of the 90's" (Manitoba Remix) – 5:37
 "No More Mosquitoes" (Boom Bip Remix) – 5:02

References

2001 debut EPs
Four Tet albums
2001 remix albums
Remix EPs
Domino Recording Company EPs
Domino Recording Company remix albums